Goadby may refer to:

Places 
Goadby, a village in Leicestershire
Goadby Marwood, a village in Leicestershire
Goadby Hall, a building near Goadby Marwood

People 
Frank Goadby (1899–1985), British and British Indian Army officer
Robert Goadby (1721–1778), English printer